Saptaswa Basu is a Bengali film director, producer, writer and editor who has been involved in directing films, telefilms and ad films.

Career 
He has founded his production house Neo Studios and has been producing his films under the same banner. Basu is a student of Electronics and Communication Engineering from RCC Institute of Information and Technology. He started directing and editing shorts since the age of 17 years and gained much appreciation and acclaim in various film festivals. After completing college, he has started working making feature films projects. His debut feature film is called Network.

Filmography 

Pratidwandi
Shree & I (2020 short film)
Network (2019) (starring Saswata Chatterjee, Sabyasachi Chakraborty, Bhaskar Banerjee, Rini Ghosh, Indrajit Mazumder, Saayoni Ghosh and others)
I/Witness (2010)
Protibimbo (2010)
Jugmapath (2010) (for AnandaUtsav.com )
Fate/Fatal (2010) 
Giallo (Yellow) (2010)
I/Witness 2 (2011)
The Forlorn (2011) 
The Oasis (2012) 
 Jotugriho (Upcoming)
 Doctor Bakshi (2023)

References

External links
 

Living people
1991 births
Bengali film directors
People from Kolkata